Muhammad Zafar Iqbal (born December 23, 1952 ) is a Bangladeshi writer, physicist and educator. He is regarded as the pioneer of writing and popularizing scientific fiction in Bangladesh . He is also a popular children's writer and columnist. His writings have been adapted into several novel films. He is currently a professor of computer science and engineering at Shahjalal University of Science and Technology and head of the Electrical Strategy Department. During the closing ceremony of a robotic competition at Shahjalal University of Science and Technology at 3 pm on March 27 (3 March 2018), a madrasa student named Faizur was attacked by the audience for attempting to kill him.

Threats of murder and others 
 When the mass rally was organized in Shahbag in the capital, demanding the maximum punishment for Jamaat leader Quader Mollah, a criminal against humanity of the Great War of Liberation in 1971, Muhammad Zafar Iqbal was at the forefront of this movement. At that time, militant organizations and militants were threatening to overthrow him. Zafar Iqbal was reported to be on the hit list of the banned militant outfit Ansar Al Islam (then named Ansarullah Bangla Team or ABT) at that time.
 On May 27, several teachers, including Muhammad Zafar Iqbal, were threatened with murder. The killing was threatened in the name of 'Al Qaeda Ansarullah Bangla Team: 13'. There was a threat in the excavation - 'mast you will prepare for the dead'.  In a letter that was then called in the post, the target was a list of five people, including Prime Minister HT Imam, Prof Arefin Siddique, Muhammad Zafar Iqbal, Kaberi Gaine , Imran H Sarker of the People's Republic and Tarana Halim . At that time, Professor Zafar Iqbal said, "The threat of murder is nothing new to me, so I am not afraid of it." I have received letters like this many times, many times, I have not told anyone, not even my wife.
 On October 24 (Wednesday), Muhammad Zafar Iqbal and his wife Yasmin Haque were threatened with the murder of a cellphone by the militant group Ansarullah Bangla Team. There it was written, 'welcome to our new top list! Your breath may stop at anytime. ABT '. At 2:30 pm on the same date, a message from Muhammad Zafar Iqbal also threatened. It was written, 'Hi Unbeliever! We will strangulate you soon '. On October 1, they made a general diary (GD) at Jalalabad police station in Sylhet city. Police said at the time, Muhammad Zafar Iqbal and his wife Yasmin Haq were threatened with a message from 121. The threat was made in the name of militant outfit Ansarullah Bangla Team. Muhammad Zafar Iqbal also made a GD in that case. Armed police guards were then placed at their residence.
 On August 27, a letter was sent from an organization called Ittehadul Mujahideen threatening to attack the sculptor, along with seven online activists, writers and writers, Muhammad Zafar Iqbal. On October 24 (Wednesday), Muhammad Zafar Iqbal and his wife Yasmin Haque were threatened with the murder of a cellphone by the militant group Ansarullah Bangla Team.
 Police recovered a hitlist from a JMB dugout in Bogra on 28 May, where Muhammad Zafar Iqbal's name was found.
 Police recovered a hitlist along with the names of four prominent men of Ansar al-Islam in the area, where Muhammad Zafar Iqbal's name was found.
 On September 27, Zafar Iqbal Shahjalal protested against the Chhatra League's attack on teachers of science and technology universities. In a speech last August, Jafar Iqbal said, "The cause of the Chhatra League will be the Awami League." For this reason, a section of the Chhatra League has been reported angry over Jafar Iqbal.
 June 28, Dr. Zafar Iqbal demanded exemplary punishment, and Awami League and eight other parties held a humanitarian program in front of the National Press Club. The program says, "Atheism is being widely patronized in the label of progressive, intellectual and freeman in this country." Atheists are publicly blaspheming against the religion of Islam everywhere, including online. '
 Sylhet-3 constituency MP Mahmud Samad Chowdhury expressed his anger against Jafar Iqbal. At a meeting, he said, "If I was a big deal, I would have stabbed Jafar Iqbal in the court pote."
 Zafar Iqbal and Yasmin Haq couple were attacked in front of Shahjalal Science and Technology University administrative building. Professor Yasmin Haque was also reported to have fallen to the ground in an attack on Vice-Chancellor-backed students when he joined the protest, which began on April 12. Angry Jafar Iqbal said at the time, "If the students who attacked the teachers here should have died in my throat if they were my students."

References 

Violence in Bangladesh